Stephen T. Asma (born 1966) is Professor of Philosophy and Distinguished Scholar at Columbia College Chicago. He is also a Senior Fellow of the Research Group in Mind, Science, and Culture at Columbia College Chicago.

He works on the philosophy of the life sciences, and the theme of religion and science (especially Buddhism and Christianity). He is considered an authority on the history and philosophy of monsters and horror.  Additionally, he works on the philosophy of improvisation and imagination. Together with actor Paul Giamatti Asma has argued that Imagination is an under-appreciated "6th Sense" and form of embodied cognition.  Asma was a Fulbright scholar in Beijing China in 2014. He writes regularly for The New York Times, The Stone, and various magazines.

Asma is a recipient of the Henry Luce Foundation grant, Public Theologies of Technology and Presence. He is exploring friendship and prosocial affect in the digital age.

Personal life
Asma also plays music professionally, with various bands, playing blues or jazz. He played with Bo Diddley in the 1990s. He has also worked as a professional freelance illustrator.

Publications
 
 
 
 
 , Revised by Hampton Roads Publishing, 2009

References

External links
 
 
 

Living people
1966 births
Columbia College Chicago faculty
Place of birth missing (living people)
Fulbright alumni